Durio testudinarius, commonly known as durian kura kura (literally: 'tortoise durian') is a species of durian tree in the family Malvaceae. It is endemic to Borneo.

Durio testudinarius grows in lowland rain forest, including valley and hill forests up to 600 meters elevation. It is typically an understory tree. It is characterized by cauliflory – flowers and fruit borne on the trunk of the tree.

See also
List of Durio species, with a paragraph on D. testudinarius.

References

testudinarius
Endemic flora of Borneo
Trees of Borneo
Vulnerable flora of Asia
Flora of the Borneo lowland rain forests
Plants described in 1889
Taxa named by Odoardo Beccari
Taxonomy articles created by Polbot